Smerral is a small hamlet on the eastern coast of Caithness, Scottish Highlands and is in the Scottish council area of Highland.

Populated places in Caithness

nl:Aberarder